The Chengmei Riverside Park is a park along the Keelung River in Taipei, Taiwan.

Geology
The park is divided into two parts by the river, the northern part which is located in Neihu District on the right side of the river bank and the southern part which is located in Nangang District on the left side of the river bank. The park on the right side of the river bank spans over an area of 9.9 hectares and the one on the left side spans over an area of 2.2 hectares.

Architecture
The park features a LOVE public artwork and the I-Love-You and Next Stop: Happiness sign on the other side. The Chengmei Bridge located within the park connects both sides of the park for traffic vehicles and pedestrians.

Transportation
The park is accessible within walking distance north east of Songshan Station of Taipei Metro.

See also
 List of parks in Taiwan

References

Parks in Taipei